Group Finot is a French boat design company based in Jouy-en-Josas. Founded by Jean-Marie Finot, the company specializes in the design of fiberglass sailboats.

The company also collaborates with designer Pascal Conq as Groupe Finot - Conq, based in Vannes, France.

History
The company was founded by Finot in 1969 when he designed his first boat, the International Offshore Rule Quarter Ton class champion Ecume de Mer (Sea Foam) that was built by Chantier Malliard.

By 2017 the company had designed 61 boats for Beneteau, their biggest customer. The first design for Beneteau was in 1978.

Boats 

Summary of boats designed by Group Finot, by year:

Ecume De Mer 1968
Jenneau Folie Douce 1970
Brise De Mer 31 1970
Brise De Mer 31 (LC) 1970
Passatore 1971
Comet 910 1971
Grand Soleil 34 (Finot) 1972
Aloa 29 1972
Fleur De Mer 1972
Comet 801 1972
Reve De Mer 1972
Gouteron Chergui 1973
Fastnet 34 1973
Comet 770 1973
Jenneau Brin De Folie 1975
Yamaha 29 1975
Brise De Mer 34 1975
Comet 850 1977
Comet 11 1977
Comet 800 1978
Beneteau First 22 1978
Beneteau First 18 1978
Beneteau First 25 SK 1979
Comet 1000 1979
Comet 111 1979
Comet 701 1979
Beneteau First 25 1979
Comet 700 1980
Comet 910 Plus 1980
Comet 14 1980
Beneteau First 28 1980
Wegu 701 (Finot) 1980
Wizz (dinghy) 1981
Beneteau First 24 1982
Beneteau First Class 8 1982
Comet 30 1982
Beneteau First Class 10 1982
Comet 13 1982
Vent De Fete 1982
Comet 1050 1983
Beneteau First 29 1983
Beneteau First Class 7 1983
Beneteau 1 Ton 1983
Comet 28 Race 1984
Comet 15 1984
Beneteau First 26 1984
Comet 860 1984
Beneteau First 285 1985
Beneteau First Class 12 1985
Comet 383 1985
Comet 11 Plus 1985
Esprit Du Vent 1985
Beneteau First 235 SK 1986
Comet 301 1986
Beneteau First 235 1986
Comet 375 1987
Comet 460 1987
Beneteau First Class Europe 1989
Grand Soleil 38 (Finot) 1990
Beneteau First 310 1990
Beneteau First 265 1990
Figaro Solo 1990
Beneteau Oceanis 400 1991
Beneteau Oceanis 300  1991
Beneteau First 260 Spirit 1994
Beneteau First 300  1994
Beneteau Oceanis 400 CC 1995
Beneteau Oceanis 281 1995
Beneteau Oceanis 321 1995
Moorings 402CC 1996
Cybelle 325 1997
Beneteau Oceanis 411 1997
Beneteau First 210 1998
Beneteau First 211 1998
Beneteau 311 1998
Beneteau Oceanis 311 1998
Beneteau Oceanis 311 LKTR 1998
Beneteau First 31.7 1998
Beneteau Oceanis 331 1999
Moorings 332 1999
Beneteau 331 1999
Giro 34 1999
Open 5.00 2000
Beneteau 473 2000
Beneteau Oceanis 473 2000
Aerodyne 35 2000
Beneteau 523 2001
Beneteau Oceanis 323 2001
Beneteau 323 2001
Beneteau Oceanis Clipper 523 2001
Pogo 2 2001
Beneteau First 27.7  2002
Beneteau 423 2002
Beneteau 31 2002
Open 5.70 2002
Cigale 14 2003
Beneteau 42 CC 2003
Beneteau Oceanis 42 CC 2003
Beneteau First 25.7 2004
Pogo 10.50 2005
Pogo 40 2005
Beneteau 37 2006
Beneteau Oceanis 31 2006
Beneteau Oceanis 37 2006
Beneteau First 21.7 2006
Beneteau First Class 7.5  2008
Beneteau First 25S 2008
Beneteau Oceanis 34 2008
Beneteau 34 2008
Beneteau First 20 2011
Pogo 12.5 2011
Beneteau Oceanis 41 2011
Beneteau Oceanis 38 2013
Beneteau Oceanis 45 2013
Pogo 30 2013
Beneteau Oceanis 35 2014
Pogo 36 2016
Beneteau Oceanis 35.1 2017

See also
List of sailboat designers and manufacturers

References

External links

Group Finot